This is a list of the Trooping the Colour ceremony in London, from 1890 to the present. The first Trooping the Colour on Horse Guards Parade took place on 4 June 1805. In 1895 two Troopings were performed, on consecutive days, by different battalions of the Scots Guards at Windsor Castle and Horse Guards Parade.

Date ranges

From 1890 to 1900, for Queen Victoria (born on 24 May), the date was various weekdays from 20 May to 3 June, only one of which was her birthday.

From 1901 to 1909, for King Edward VII (born on 9 November), it was a Friday from 24 May to 28 June.

From 1910 to 1935, for King George V (born on 3 June), it was various weekdays from 27 May to 22 June, most of which were not his birthday.

In 1936, it was on King Edward VIII's actual birthday (23 June).

From 1937 to 1951, for King George VI (born on 14 December), it was from 7 to 12 June.

For Queen Elizabeth II (born on 21 April):
 from 1952 to 1958, it was a Thursday from 31 May to 13 June;
 from 1959 to 1978, it was a Saturday from 2 to 15 June;
 from 1979 to 2017, it was the Saturday from 11 to 17 June (the 2nd Saturday, 8 to 14, of June was a myth);
 from 2018 to 2021, it was the Saturday from 8 to 13 June;
 in 2022 it was Thursday 2 June.

In 2023, for King Charles III (born on 14 November), Saturday 17 June is intended.

List

Notes

References

External links
 Programme Archive (official Parade pamphlets)

Annual events in London
British Army lists
British Army traditions
British monarchy
Household Division (United Kingdom)
Military parades in the United Kingdom
State ritual and ceremonies